Behind the Sun is a 2001 Brazilian-French-Swiss social drama film directed by Walter Salles, produced by Arthur Cohn, and starring Rodrigo Santoro. Its original Portuguese title means Shattered April, and it is based on the 1978 novel Broken April written by the Albanian writer Ismail Kadare, about the honor culture in the North of Albania.

Co-produced by Brazil, France, and Switzerland, it was shot entirely in Bahia, taking place in Bom Sossego, a district of the city of Oliveira dos Brejinhos, and in the cities of Caetité and Rio de Contas.

Plot
The year is 1910; the place, the badlands of Northeast Region, Brazil. Twenty-year-old Tonho is the middle son of an impoverished farm family, the Breves. He is next in line to kill and then die in an ongoing blood feud with a neighboring clan, the Ferreiras. For generations, the two families have quarreled over land. Now they are locked into a series of tit-for-tat assassinations of their sons; an eye-for-an-eye, a tooth-for-a-tooth. Embedded in this choreography of death is a particular code of ethics: "Blood has the same volume for everyone. You have no right to take more blood than was taken from you." Life is suffused with a sense of futility and stoic despair.

Under pressure from his father, Tonho kills one of the Ferreira sons to avenge the murder of his older brother. This act marks him as the next victim. Tonho's younger brother is addressed only as "the Kid" by the family. Anticipating future loss, his parents don't give him a name. The Kid is an imaginative and loving child, whose spirit will not break in the face of harsh parenting, brutalizing isolation, and numbing poverty. The Kid's love encourages Tonho to question his fate. When Tonho meets Clara, a charming itinerant circus girl, all of life's possibilities open up for him.

The film is narrated by "The Kid" who is later given a name by Clara and her stepfather, the traveling circus performers.  They call him "Pacu" and he spends the whole film narrating which ultimately drives the viewers to identify and allows the film to humanize the characters.

Later, Pacu and Tonho visit the circus in town, with Tonho forming a relationship with Clara. Clara later leaves her stepfather to be with Tonho, arriving at the farm to be with him. The two sleep together before she departs, telling Tonho to meet her in the east by the ocean. One of the Ferreira men come to the farm in order to exact revenge on the Breves, initially appearing to kill Tonho. However, it is revealed that they actually shot and killed Pacu, devastating the Breves.

The father tells Tonho to get the gun in order to kill all of the remaining Ferreiras in retaliation. Tonho, realizing that his life with his family is destroyed, walks off without a word. His father attempts to shoot him for disregarding the honor of their family, but he is stopped by the mother who insists that the feud no longer matters and that it's over. Tonho arrives on a beach, staring at the sea with an expression of melancholic wonder on his face.

Cast
José Dumont as the father
Rodrigo Santoro as Tonho, the eldest son
Rita Assemany as the Mother
Ravi Ramos Lacerda as Pacu
Luiz Carlos Vasconcelos as Salustiano
Flávia Marco Antonio as Clara
Everaldo Pontes as Old Blind Man
Caio Junqueira as Inácio
Mariana Loureiro as Widow
Servilio De Holanda as Isaías
Wagner Moura as Matheus
Othon Bastos as Mr. Lourenço
Gero Camilo as Reginaldo
Vinícius de Oliveira as "the Kid"

Awards and nominations
BAFTA Film Awards
Best Film Not in the English Language – Arthur Cohn and Walter Salles (nominated)

Golden Globe Awards
Best Foreign Language Film (nominated)

Havana Film Festival
Best Director – Walter Salles (won)
House of the Americas Award – Walter Salles (won)

Venice Film Festival
Little Golden Lion – Arthur Cohn and Walter Salles (won)
Golden Lion – Walter Salles (nominated)

References

External links

2001 drama films
2001 films
Films based on Albanian novels
Brazilian comedy films
Films directed by Walter Salles
Films shot in Bahia
2000s Portuguese-language films
Films set in 1910
Films scored by Antônio Pinto